An overvote occurs when one votes for more than the maximum number of selections allowed in a contest. The result is a spoiled vote which is not included in the final tally.

One example of an overvote would be voting for two candidates in a single race with the instruction "Vote for not more than one." Robert's Rules of Order notes that such votes are illegal.

The exact definition of overvotes is ambiguous in a contest with N-of-M voting, where N of M choices can be selected and N>1 (vote for no more than N). Sometimes overvotes are reported as the number of ballots overvoted in the contest, and sometimes it is reported as N*overvoted-ballots.

Undervotes combined with overvotes (known as residual votes) can be an academic indicator in evaluating the accuracy of a voting system when recording voter intent.

While an overvote in a plurality voting system or limited voting is always illegal, in certain other electoral methods including approval voting, this style of voting is valid, and thus invalid overvotes are not possible.

In the corporate world, the term "overvote" describes a situation in which someone votes more proxies than they are authorized to, or for more shares than they hold of record.

References

External links
 USAToday.com – How USA Today and others examined overvote

Elections
Voting theory